Dandys Rule OK is the debut studio album by American alternative rock band The Dandy Warhols, recorded from 1994 to 1995 and released on 6 April 1995 by Tim/Kerr Records.

Three singles were released from the album: "Ride", "The Dandy Warhols T.V. Theme Song" and "Nothin' to Do".

Background 

The album is sometimes referred to as The White Album, in reference to the album cover which bears similarities to The Beatles' self-titled album (which is also known as The White Album), in contrast to the band's The Black Album, recorded the following year in 1996 but not released until 2004.

Release 

Three singles were released from the album: "Ride", "The Dandy Warhols T.V. Theme Song" and "Nothin' to Do". "T.V. Theme Song" aired on several radio stations and appeared on MTV.

Reception 

The album has received a mixed reception from critics. Q magazine wrote that it's "what the Portland quartet sound like on bad drugs". NME also gave it a negative review, calling it an "unfocused, sprawling debut album, notable for the piledriving classic 'TV Theme Song', an awful lot of stoned noodling and pretty much sod-all else."

Track listing 

A hidden track starts at 3:11 into "Finale: It's a Fast Driving Rave-Up with The Dandy Warhols". It is a short reprise of "Dick".

Personnel

The Dandy Warhols 

 Courtney Taylor-Taylor – guitar, vocals, production, sleeve design and layout
 Zia McCabe –  keyboards and percussion
 Peter Holmström – guitar
 Eric Hedford – drums, vocals and synthesizer

Additional personnel 

 Zedekiah Pariah – Jew's harp on "Grunge Betty" and lap steel guitar and harmonica on "Just Try"
 Derek Ecklund – sitar on "Dick"
 Julianne Johnson – vocals on "Just Try"
 Tony Lash – percussion and production
 Tim Rooney – congas on "The Coffee and Tea Wrecks"
 Teddy Deane –  flute on "(Tony, This Song Is Called) Lou Weed"
 Dave Kinhan – album artwork painting
 Tony Lash – engineering, mastering and production
 Marc Trunz – sleeve photography
 Steven Birch – album design

References

External links 
 Dandys Rule OK at The Dandy Warhols' official website
 

1995 debut albums
The Dandy Warhols albums